Spivey is a city in Kingman County, Kansas, United States.  As of the 2020 census, the population of the city was 61.

History
Spivey is the name of Col. E.M. Spivey, member of the town company.  Spivey has had a post office since 1886.

Geography
Spivey is located at  (37.447216, -98.164002).

Demographics

2010 census
As of the census of 2010, there were 78 people, 37 households, and 25 families living in the city. The racial makeup of the city was 96.2% White and 3.8% Native American. Hispanic or Latino of any race were 12.8% of the population.

There were 37 households, of which 18.9% had children under the age of 18 living with them, 40.5% were married couples living together, 18.9% had a female householder with no husband present, 8.1% had a male householder with no wife present, and 32.4% were non-families. 32.4% of all households were made up of individuals, and 21.6% had someone living alone who was 65 years of age or older. The average household size was 2.11 and the average family size was 2.56.

The median age in the city was 51.5 years. 17.9% of residents were under the age of 18; 1.3% were between the ages of 18 and 24; 21.7% were from 25 to 44; 30.8% were from 45 to 64; and 28.2% were 65 years of age or older. The gender makeup of the city was 50.0% male and 50.0% female.

2000 census
As of the census of 2000, there were 80 people, 37 households, and 25 families living in the city. The racial makeup of the city was 100.00% White. Hispanic or Latino of any race were 5.00% of the population.

There were 37 households, out of which 27.0% had children under the age of 18 living with them, 56.8% were married couples living together, 5.4% had a female householder with no husband present, and 32.4% were non-families. 32.4% of all households were made up of individuals, and 5.4% had someone living alone who was 65 years of age or older. The average household size was 2.16 and the average family size was 2.72.

In the city, the population was spread out, with 25.0% under the age of 18, 5.0% from 18 to 24, 31.3% from 25 to 44, 23.8% from 45 to 64, and 15.0% who were 65 years of age or older. The median age was 40 years. For every 100 females, there were 128.6 males. For every 100 females age 18 and over, there were 122.2 males.

The median income for a household in the city was $37,250, and the median income for a family was $38,125. Males had a median income of $40,625 versus $6,250 for females. The per capita income for the city was $23,849. There were 4.8% of families and 6.6% of the population living below the poverty line, including no under eighteens and 15.0% of those over 64.

Education
The community is served by Kingman–Norwich USD 331 public school district.

References

Further reading

External links

 Spivey - Directory of Public Officials
 Spivey city map, KDOT

Cities in Kansas
Cities in Kingman County, Kansas